Armored infantry can mean:

 Modern mechanized infantry
 Historical heavy infantry